The 1956–57 season was Beşiktaş's 41st official football season and their 54th year in existence. They finished 5th in the 1956-57 Istanbul League season behind Fenerbahçe, Galatasaray, İstanbulspor and Beykoz. They also competed in Turkey's first ever professional national league, the Turkish Federation Cup. They won the cup and qualified for the 1957–58 European Cup, but the Turkish Football Federation did not send their names to the UEFA, therefore being disqualified without playing a single match.

İstanbul Football League

In the 1956-57 İstanbul Football League season Beşiktaş finished 5th place.

References

External links
Turkish Soccer

Beşiktaş J.K. seasons
Besiktas